The Quintessential Vocal Ensemble is an amateur choir based in St. John's, Newfoundland and Labrador, Canada. The choir, formed in 1993, is led by Susan Quinn, and consists of approximately 40 members.

The choir is known to perform pieces from a variety of musical genres including classical, jazz, contemporary and traditional Newfoundland.

The choir has won several national and international awards:
 First prize (Mixed Choirs) and second prize (Youth Choirs) in the Llangollen International Musical Eisteddfod in Wales
 Second prize in the Cork International Choral Festival in Ireland
 The Prix du Ministère de la Culture et de la Communication, Prix Rabelais, and Prix Ockhegem in the Florilège Vocal de Tours in France
 First prize (Mixed Community Choirs) in the CBC National Radio Competition for Amateur Choirs
 First prize and the City of Lincoln Trophy (Adult Choirs) of the Federation of Canadian Music Festivals.

External links
 Quintessential Vocal Ensemble official website

Musical groups established in 1993
Musical groups from St. John's, Newfoundland and Labrador
Canadian choirs